The Tehran derby (Persian: شهرآورد تهران Shahrāvard-e Tehrān), also known as Blue-Red derby (Persian:شهرآورد  سرخابی Shahrāvard-e Sorkhābi) is a football match between the two prominent Tehran clubs Esteghlal and Persepolis.

It is widely considered the major crosstown derby in the Persian Gulf Pro League. This match was declared as the most important derby in Asia and 22nd most important derby in the world in June 2008 by World Soccer magazine.  It is considered one of the world's most intense derbies. Despite being a derby between two teams from Tehran, the match has been played in other Iranian cities as well. Taking place at least twice during the year via the league fixtures, this cross-town rivalry has extended to the Hazfi Cup, as well as in minor tournaments and friendlies.

History 
The first derby match between the teams took place on April 5, 1968, at Amjadieh Stadium, where the game finished as a scoreless draw. At the time, Esteghlal was known as Taj SC. Both clubs were relatively young but Persepolis had a solid fan base, because of its close association to the once popular Shahin club. The rivalry between Shahin and Taj was transferred to its current stage when the Shahin club had to cease operations due to poor relations with the IFF.

Over time, the rivalry became more heated and club fans began attaining collective identities. By the mid-1970s Persepolis was seen as a working class club, while Taj was viewed as a club close to the ruling establishment and supported by the upper class of Iranian society. Persepolis fans outnumbered Esteghlal fans by large numbers at the time.

Due to the sensitive nature of the matches, fan violence has occurred several times. In minor cases, fans break chairs or throw garbage at the field, but in some cases, fans have stormed the field of play, physical fights between opposing teams and fans have broken out, and public property has been destroyed.

Ever since 1995, federation officials have invited foreign referees to officiate the game to ease fan and player suspicions of referee bias. This occurred after the events of the 39th derby (see below).

Azadi Stadium has been the stadium where most of the matches took place, but Amjadieh Stadium (now Shiroudi) in Tehran and Sahand Stadium in Tabriz have all hosted the game at least once.

Hassan Rowshan from Esteghlal F.C., at the age of 18 years and 357 days is yet the youngest player ever who has scored a goal in the Tehran derby. He scored the only goal in a 1–0 win against Persepolis F.C. on May 25, 1974.
Ali Alipour, at the age of 19 years and 185 days, became the youngest Persepolis F.C. player ever to score in Tehran derby. He scored the only goal in their 1–0 victory on May 15, 2010.

Notable matches 
 Persepolis 0 – Taj 1 (0–3) (February 6, 1970) – The game score was 0–1 in favor of Taj until the 82nd minute when the Persepolis players left the field to protest against the match officials. The football federation later declared Esteghlal the winner by a score of 3–0.
 Persepolis 1 (0) – Taj 1 (3) (January 17, 1971) – The game was tied 1–1 until the 75th minute when the Persepolis players left the field to protest against the match officials after several decisions went Esteghlal's way. The football federation later declared Taj the winner by a score of 3–0. This was the second time this occurred in two years.
 Persepolis 4 – Taj 1 (February 4, 1972) – This was Persepolis's first win in the derby match, which was also a Goalfull match. First time Persepolis beat its rival with 4 goals.
 Persepolis 6 – Taj 0 (September 7, 1973) – Persepolis's best ever result in Tehran derby. Homayoun Behzadi hattricked, Iraj Soleimani Scored twice and another goal scored by Hossein Kalani.
 Esteghlal 1 – Persepolis 0 (October 7, 1983) – Iranian television broadcaster IRIB did not air the match so a large number of fans flocked to Azadi Stadium. An estimated 128,000 entered the 100,000-capacity stadium. So many fans were in attendance that some were forced to climb the metal base of the stadium floodlights. None of the derby matches to this date have had a higher attendance and mostly likely never will as the 2002 renovations of the stadium reduced its capacity.
 Esteghlal 0(2)  – Persepolis 0(4)  (March 1989) – This is one of few times the two clubs have met each other in the Hazfi Cup. The match finished scoreless in regulation time, and extra-time was a great game. Persepolis won in penalty.

 Esteghlal 2 – Persepolis 2 (January 20, 1995) – In the 39th derby Persepolis was leading in the match by a score of 2–0 until the last 10 minutes of the match. Esteghlal scored 2 goals in quick succession, including one which was a penalty. This angered the Persepolis fans and players who felt the referee was biased towards Esteghlal. Persepolis fans stormed the field, and many fights broke out on the pitch between fans and players. After this match it was decided that Iranian referees will no longer be used for the derby.
 Persepolis 3 – Esteghlal 0 (July 11, 1997) – One of the most one-sided derby matches for the two teams. Persepolis dominated the match with scoring 3 goals by Edmond Bezik, Mehdi Mahdavikia and Behnam Taherzadeh. In addition to this 3 goals, Persepolis also hit the post bar for 3 times. Persepolis won Esteghlal 2 times back and forth in this league season and won championship at the end.
 Persepolis 2 – Esteghlal 2 (December 29, 2000) – The game was extremely sensitive as Mehdi Hasheminasab had left Persepolis in the off-season for Esteghlal. Behrouz Rahbarifar opened up the scoring in minute 56, while Mohammad Navazi tied the game up at the 67th minute. Many thought the game would be over when Hasheminasab scored a late goal at minute 86, but Ali Karimi saved Persepolis scoring a goal at minute 89 to please the red fans. During the game Esteghlal's goalkeeper Parviz Broumand and Persepolis striker Payan Rafat were constantly insulting each other. This eventually led to Broumand punching Rafat in the face and giving him a black eye. A massive fight broke out between the players. After the match hooligans went on a rampage. They completely destroyed 250 city buses and damaged many shops.  Three players from each side were arrested along with 60 fans for their behavior.
 Persepolis 2 – Esteghlal 1 (November 3, 2006) – One of the most important derby matches for the two teams. Both teams' chances of winning the league were very unlikely so the two desperately wanted to win so one would finish above the other. Amir Hossein Sadeghi broke the deadlock with a header in the 16th minute to make it 1–0 to Esteghlal. Six minutes later, Esteghlal goalkeeper Mehdi Rahmati charged out of his goal to clear the ball for a corner to Persepolis. However, he lost his concentration and took a long time to return to his net resulting in Mehrzad Madanchi curling one in for Persepolis from the corner of the pitch and making the score 1–1 at half-time. The match was very open in the second half and finally in the 71st minute, Mehrdad Oladi broke through and chipped Mehdi Rahmati to win the game for Persepolis 2–1. Later on that season, Persepolis finished 3rd in the league, one place above Esteghlal who finished 4th.
 Persepolis 2 – Esteghlal 1 (February 3, 2010) – Before this derby, six straight derby games between the two had finished 1–1. Many fans were claiming that the matches had been fixed to avoid having a losing team. Both teams had the same owner, a fact that obviously added fuel to the fire. Prior to this game, the two teams had a several year-long tradition of eating dinner together on the evening before the games, a tradition which did not take place ahead of this very tense game. Much to many fans' expectations this game was also about to end in a 1–1 draw before Karim Bagheri scored a screamer from 35 yards late in the game to win the match 2–1 for Persepolis.
 Esteghlal 1 – Persepolis 0 (October 15, 2010) – The match was tied late in the game when Esteghlal got a counterattack and captain Farhad Majidi scored the winning goal in the 91st minute.
 Esteghlal 3 – Persepolis 0 (December 9, 2011) – The first meeting of the two teams in the Hazfi Cup in over a decade, the match was tied 0–0 at the end of regulation time leading to overtime. In over time Esteghlal dominated the game scoring three goals claiming their 24th win in the derby and their fourth consecutive competitive win (only considering Persian Gulf Pro League and the Hazfi Cup) for Esteghlal over their city rivals. Indeed, the match 73 in the chart below happened almost one month before this match (which is match 74) and was a draw. This derby was the largest goal margin in 14 years and the largest Esteghlal win in over 30 years.
 Esteghlal 2 – Persepolis 3 (February 2, 2012) – After losing four times in a row (but only considering Persian Gulf Pro League and the Hazfi Cup, i.e. matches 70–72 and 74, match 73 being a draw), Persepolis and its fans were desperate for a win over their blue rivals. Head coach Mustafa Denizli had returned to the reds for the second half of the season and had previously experienced victory over Esteghlal back in 2006. Persepolis found themselves 2–0 down yet again and had Mehrdad Oladi very harshly sent off for what was seen as just a foul. Mazloumi and blues fans were beginning celebrations of yet another victory over their rivals as Persepolis fans began to leave the stadium when suddenly newly signed forward Eamon Zayed bagged a goal back for the reds in the 82nd minute. Persepolis were lifted by this goal and Zayed immediately connected with Mehdi Mahdavikia's excellent cross a minute later and levelled the score to 2–2 with a fine header. The last five minutes of the game was very open with Persepolis looking more lively and in the 92nd minute of the match, Hossein Badamaki's cross found Zayed yet again and the Libyan striker turned his defender and finished brilliantly to round off a historic hat-trick and great win for Persepolis and its fans.
 Persepolis 4 – Esteghlal 2 (April 15, 2016) – This derby was highly anticipated and vital for both teams as they were competing for the top spot in the Iran Pro League table. Persepolis came into this match with an excellent form and were regarded as favourites to win; however, Esteghlal was in 2nd place above their archrival on goal difference. In a highly entertaining and end-to-end game, the red-clad Persepolis netted twice in each half to beat the blue-shirted Esteghlal 4–2 in their 83rd derby in Tehran on a rainy Friday and be the new Iran Pro League table-topper in the 26th week.
 Esteghlal 3 – Persepolis 2 (February 2, 2017) – After five years of unbeaten derbies, Persepolis lost in a dramatic match. Persepolis had conceded only five goals in 20 previous league matches but in this game, Esteghlal scored three goals in the first half and shocked the Persepolis players and fans. The struggling match finished with a 3–2 result after several quarrels in which Mehdi Rahmati (Esteghlal goalkeeper) has been sent off by the referee.

Statistics

Matches

Head to head 
As of 17 March 2022, there have been 98 competitive first-class meetings between the two teams since the first league meeting in 1969. In all 91 official competitive meetings since 1968, Esteghlal has won 23 and Persepolis 25.

Trophies

Records

Biggest wins in official competitions 
Criteria: the winning team scored three goals or above with two or more goal difference from the defeated team.

Persepolis
 Persepolis 4–1 Esteghlal on 4 February 1972
 Persepolis 6–0 Esteghlal on 7 September 1973
 Persepolis 3–0 Esteghlal on 15 June 1986
 Esteghlal 0–3 Persepolis on 11 July 1997
 Persepolis 4–2 Esteghlal on 15 April 2016

Esteghlal

 Esteghlal  3–1 Persepolis on 22 August 1969
 Esteghlal  3–1 Persepolis on 5 May 1975
 Persepolis 0-7 Esteghlal on 8 May 1977
 Persepolis 1_9 Esteghlal on 28 July 1995
 Persepolis 0-12 Esteghlal on 9 December 2011

Goal scorers 

 Players in Italic are still active in football.
 Players in bold are still active for Esteghlal or Persepolis.

League = "Iranian League" or "Tehran Province League" ; Cup = "Hazfi Cup" ; Other = "Friendlies" or "Exhibitions"

Hat-tricks 

 
A hat-trick is achieved when the same player scores three or more goals in one match. Listed in chronological order.

Most successful coaches

Players who played for both clubs 
Over the years, a number of players have played for both of the heavily supported clubs. Switching sides often angers fans, and players who have done so are heavily booed and mocked in and out of the stadium. When Mehdi Hasheminasab joined Esteghlal, Persepolis fans booed and swore at him so loudly that he covered his face with his hands to hide his tears.

Esteghlal then Persepolis
  Ahmadreza Abedzadeh
  Reza Ahadi
  Ali Akbarian
  Javad Allahverdi
  Saeid Azizian
  Maysam Baou
  Shahrokh Bayani
  Cheick Diabaté
  Akbar Eftekhari
  Faraz Fatemi
  Gholamreza Fathabadi
  Parviz Ghelichkhani
  Farzad Hatami
  Meysam Hosseini
  Mahmoud Kalhor
  Mohammad Reza Mahdavi
  Dariush Mostafavi
  Amir Mousavinia
  Majid Namjoo-Motlagh
  Mehrdad Pouladi
  Mehdi Salehpour
  Davoud Seyed Abbasi
  Mehdi Seyed-Salehi
  Mehdi Shiri
  Alireza Vahedi Nikbakht

Persepolis then Esteghlal
  Ali Alizadeh
  Ali Ansarian
  Farzad Ashoubi
  Behzad Dadashzadeh
  Jacques Elong Elong
  Mohammad Ghazi
  Mehdi Hasheminasab
  Hossein Kanaanizadegan
  Godwin Mensha
  Mohammad Mohammadi
  Hawar Mulla Mohammed
  Mohammad Naderi
  Pejman Nouri
  Mehrdad Oladi
  Arman Ramezani
  Ebrahim Taghipour

Referees

IPL referees

Other notable referees 
 Markus Merk
 Kim Young-Joo
 Sándor Puhl
 Jamal Al Sharif
 Omer Al Mehannah
 Abdul Rahman Al-Zeid
 Rudolf Scheurer
 Jack Taylor

Gallery

See also 
 List of Tehran Derby matches

References 

The battle of Tehran FIFA
 "Football, blood and war" The Observer, 18 January 2004, accessed 11 October 2006
 "The Red 'Victors' and the 'Independent' Blues" FIFA Magazine, 31 October 2002, accessed 11 October 2006
  "59 بازی حاصل 37 سال رقابت سرخ و آبی" Fars News Agency, 8 March 2006, accessed 11 October 2006
  "پرسپوليس ، استقلال از نگاه آمار" Aftab Yazd, 8 March 2006, accessed 11 October 2006
  "در حاشيه ي بازيهاي سرخابي ازگذشته هاي دورتا امروز" Tebyan.net, 2 November 2005, accessed 11 October 2006

External links 

Profile at Football derbies.com
Statistics on Persepolis Official Website

Football derbies in Iran
Sport in Tehran
derby
derby
Persepolis F.C. matches
Esteghlal F.C. matches